Mpanda is a commune of Bubanza Province in north-western Burundi. The capital lies at Mpanda city.

Communes of Burundi
Bubanza Province